The internet in the European Union is built through the infrastructure of member states, and regulated by EU law for data privacy, and a free and open media.

Infrastructure
WiFi boxes
Cables, copper to fibre-optic
Electro-magnetic signals
Transnational lines

Regulation

Electronic Communications Code Directive 2018/1972 arts 3-17, 61-84
Access Directive 2002/19/EC arts 3-6 and Annex I
Information Society Directive 2015/1535 Annex I
Electronic Commerce Directive 2000/31/EC arts 1, 3, 14-15 (
General Data Protection Regulation 2016/679 arts 4(11), 5-8, 13-17
Net Neutrality Regulation 2015/2120 art 3(3)
Roaming Regulation (EU) No 531/2012 arts 7-8

Speed
The European Union pledges that all households will have at least 100Mbps internet speed in 2025, and 1000Mbps not until 2030.

See also
EU law

Internet by country
Internet